Piotr Rogucki (born 5 May 1978 in Łódź) is a Polish singer, musician, and actor, best known as the leader of rock band Coma. Rogucki is a member of the Polish Society of the Phonographic Industry.

History  
Rogucki graduated from Ludwik Solski Academy for the Dramatic Arts. He started his career by performing at various artistic previews and festivals, where he has received many awards.

He has released six studio albums with Coma:  Pierwsze wyjście z mroku (2004), Zaprzepaszczone siły wielkiej armii świętych znaków (2006), Hipertrofia (2008), Excess (2010), an untitled album commonly known as Czerwony album (2011) and Don't Set Your Dogs on Me (2013). He has also released two solo studio albums, Loki – Wizja Dźwięku (2011) and ''95–2003' (2012).

Apart from his musical career, Rogucki is also an actor. He has performed on stage of TR Warszawa, and starred in several films and TV series.

Discography

Studio albums

Music videos

Guest appearances

Filmography 
Credits adapted from Filmweb database.

Films

TV series

References

External links

 

21st-century Polish male actors
Living people
1978 births
Mystic Production artists
Polish rock singers
Polish lyricists
21st-century Polish male singers
21st-century Polish singers